The Alberta Energy Regulator (AER) is an Alberta corporation, with its main office in Calgary, Alberta. The AER's mandate under the Responsible Energy Development Act (REDA), passed on 10 December 2012 and proclaimed on 17 June 2013, is to provide safe, efficient, orderly, and environmentally responsible development of energy resources in the province. Under the REDA, the Alberta Government established the AER in December 2012 to provide a one-stop shop for regulatory approvals after industry complained about the delays and costs of red tape. The legislation combined duties of the Energy Resources Conservation Board with responsibilities of Alberta Environment and Sustainable Resource Development to create a single entity to administer the Public Lands Act, the Environmental Protection and Enhancement Act and the Water Act. The AER operates at arm's length from the Government of Alberta, under an appointed board of directors headed by Chair David Goldie. On 17 June 2013, all regulatory functions previously carried out by the Energy Resources Conservation Board were taken over by the AER.

The AER also "considers some 36,800 applications for energy development every year."

Background
Energy regulation in Alberta has a 83-year history, evolving over time to meet changing technologies and public needs. Following its creation in 1938 with the Petroleum and Natural Gas Conservation Board, the regulatory body has consistently overseen energy development in the province. It has existed under several names throughout its history, including the Alberta Oil and Gas Conservation Board, the Alberta Energy and Utilities Board, and the Alberta Energy Resources Conservation Board. The AER builds off of this legacy, but it is, under the REDA, an entirely new organization with new regulatory functions and authority over energy-related applications and developments.

Responsible Energy Development Act 
In December 2012, the REDA passed in the Alberta Legislature as part of the Regulatory Enhancement Project. The REDA made the AER "responsible for all projects from application to reclamation," with "the authority to administer the Public Lands Act, the Environmental Protection and Enhancement Act and the Water Act, with regards to energy development." The AER was phased in over nine months beginning in June 2013. In March 2014, the AER became the single regulator for energy development in Alberta; it now enforces environmental laws and issues environmental and water permits for energy developments, which were formerly responsibilities of Alberta Environment and Sustainable Resource Development.

Responsibilities

The AER "ensures the safe, efficient, orderly, and environmentally responsible development of hydrocarbon resources over their entire life cycle. This includes allocating and conserving water resources, managing public lands, and environmental protection while providing economic benefits for all Albertans." These hydrocarbon resources are among the world's largest reserves at 167 billion barrels of bitumen and crude oil, 33.7 trillion cubic feet of natural gas, and 37 billion tons of coal. The AER also regulates the infrastructure associated with these reserves, including a provincial pipeline network of 415,000 kilometres (km), over 181,000 operating wells, more than 50,000 oil and gas facilities, over 200 thermal oil sands projects, nine oil sands mines, 11 coal mines, and four coal processing plants.

The Government of Alberta has granted the AER authority to review and make decisions on proposed energy developments, to oversee all aspects of energy resource activities in accordance with government policies, to regularly inspect energy activities to ensure that all applicable requirements are met, to penalize companies that fail to comply with AER requirements, and to hold hearings on proposed energy developments. As the single regulator, it is responsible for all energy-related applications under the Environmental Protection and Enhancement Act, the Water Act, the Public Lands Act, and the Mines and Minerals Act. The AER also responds to concerns from landowners, First Nations, industry, and other stakeholders regarding energy regulations in Alberta and mediates disputes surrounding energy projects.

In the past the Energy Resources Conservation Board and Alberta Environment and Sustainable Resource Development conducted investigations separately, but, with the creation of a single regulatory body for energy developments, the AER now conducts investigations and inspections to ensure compliance with all regulatory, environmental, and safety requirements. The AER can enforce industry compliance with regulations using tools that include more frequent and detailed inspections, more stringent planning requirements, enforcement orders, shutting down operations, administrative penalties, and prosecution. The AER regularly posts details of compliance activities on the AER website, which also includes copies of all investigation reports.

Since the Energy Resources Conservation Board (ERCB) was succeeded by AER, as part of their succession title pages of all existing ERCB directives such as Directive 074 regarding oil sands tailings ponds performance dated 3 February 2009, now carry the AER logo.

Governance structure
The AER's governance structure uses a corporate-style system to "achieve benefits of both strong corporate oversight and independent adjudication." Thus, the board of directors determines the general direction of the regulator rather than overseeing the AER's day-to-day operations and decisions – these are the responsibility of the chief executive officer. The CEO receives and makes decisions on applications, monitors and investigates energy resource activities for compliance, and oversees the closure of energy developments, including reclamation and remediation of the land.

Hearing commissioners constitute another part of the AER's structure. They conduct all hearings into energy applications and regulatory appeals, in addition to helping to develop the organization's hearing procedures and rules as well as other day-to-day operations. Hearing commissioners are independent adjudicators, and their decisions may only be reviewed by the Court of Appeal of Alberta.

AER chair Gerry Protti was a former executive with Encana, the founding president of the Canadian Association of Petroleum Producers (CAPP), and a long-time lobbyist for the Energy Policy Institute of Canada. The appointment was met with calls for his resignation as he was seen to be biased in favour of industry. The organization's governance structure, however, delegates decisions on contested applications and developments to the hearing commissioners, with the chair heading a board of directors tasked with setting performance expectations and approving regulatory change. Jim Ellis, a former deputy minister in environment and energy, was appointed as CEO by the Lieutenant Governor in Council.

Funding
The AER is 100 per cent funded by industry and is authorized to collect funds through an administrative fee levied on oil and gas wells, oil sands mines, and coal mines. The industry-funded model is commonly used by regulatory agencies from various sectors across North America, such as the Alberta Utilities Commission and the BC Oil and Gas Commission. Its budget is established through a formal process between the Government of Alberta's Treasury Board and the AER, and the budget must be approved by the Government of Alberta. The AER has an annual budget of more than $165 million and more than 1200 staff working in 15 locations across Alberta.

2014
Gerry Protti, provided an overview of AER's first year in operation beginning April 2014, to one hundred participants at Green Regs & Ham in Calgary hosted by the Environmental Law Centre and sponsored by Devon Canada and Cenovus Energy. Protti described AER's "holistic approach" to oil and gas development and regulation under Alberta's Water Act and Environmental Protection and Enhancement Act, the "adoption of "play-based" regulation, which focuses on regulating the surface and subsurface of a particular formation (as opposed to the traditional one well-one licence approach); use of a performance-based approach to regulate outcomes, which includes managing cumulative effects, minimizing spread of surface infrastructure, and conserving and managing water; and increased planning and collaboration among companies and community stakeholders." During question period Protti admitted "despite working hard on it over the past year, the AER could have communicated better with the public."

2015
During the 2015 IHS Inc. CERAWeek, Rex Tillerson, chairman and CEO of ExxonMobil, the world's biggest energy company, praised Alberta's province's regulatory process for bringing critical regulatory "functions under one umbrella...[the AER]...decreasing duplication and costs and increasing efficiency." Tillerson argued that the U.S. energy policy has not "kept up with rapid changes in the sector."

Critiques
In March 2013, critics expressed concern that the AER would lead to less transparency in the regulation of the oil, gas and coal industry and would weaken environmental protection. Alberta Surface Rights Group, the United Landowners of Alberta, First Nations, farmers and ranchers have expressed concerns about the streamlining of regulatory processes that may benefit oil and gas industries at their expense. Energy Minister Ken Hughes argued that the Policy Management Office would oversee AER when it takes over from Environment and Sustainable Resource Development (ESRD) in issuing permits related to water and to the environment. The Canadian Association of Petroleum Producers (CAPP) welcomes the change that will streamline access to water and environmental permits for oil companies, by creating a one-stop-shop with "much needed clarity". Rachel Notley, the New Democrat's environment critic, expressed concern that the security of water and the environment would be compromised if the all decisions relating to development in the energy sector—including oil, gas and coal—are regulated under the AER, which is entirely funded by these industries. Prior to Bill 2, the Responsible Energy Development Act, the Alberta Environment regulated these permits under three provincial laws, the Water Act, the Public Lands Act, and the Environmental Protection and Enhancement Act.

In an interview in June 2015 Alberta Premier Rachel Notley expressed concerns that the AER appeared to have a "conflicting mandate" as both an energy promoter and "the primary vehicle of environmental protection in Alberta" and considered splitting it. She was concerned that AER had "responsibility for most of the environmental protection and monitoring part and standards development within the energy sector." Some in the oil industry insiders, such as Bill Andrew, CEO of Long Run Exploration, supports splitting up "AER’s functions because the current regulator has too much on its plate". Others, however such as Gary Leach, president of the Explorers and Producers Association of Canada, argue that AER's primary role is "environmental protection, public safety and resource conservation – not the promotion of energy development," and that the "many jurisdictions in North America and around the world" see AER "as a leading regulator for energy projects."

Global New's request for a freedom of information resulted in the release of AER CEO Laurie Pushor's 20 April 2020 "internal briefing note" consisting of 60 pages of emails.

Investigations
On 5 October 2019 three independent investigations into AER's International Centre of Regulatory Excellence (ICORE), submitted their findings. In response to a whistle blower complaint the three agencies—the Alberta Ethics Commissioner Marguerite Trussler, the Public Interest Commissioner, and the Auditor General had undertaken launched separate probes into the AER in 2018.

See also
Athabasca oil sands
National Energy Board
Environmental impact of mining
Canadian Centre for Energy Information
History of the petroleum industry in Canada (oil sands and heavy oil)
The Alberta Geological Survey

Notes

References

Further reading

External links
AER
Alberta Geological Survey Website

Alberta government departments and agencies
Energy regulatory authorities
Energy in Canada
Oil pipelines in Canada
Natural gas pipelines in Canada
Regulators of Canada